Vladimir Vasilyevich Suslov (13 July 1857, Moscow – August 1921, Khvalynsk) was a Russian architect, archaeologist, architectural historian and restorer.

Life and work 
His father was an icon painter and he spent most of childhood in Palekh. He graduated from the Moscow School of Painting, Sculpture and Architecture in 1878, with a small silver medal. He then entered the Imperial Academy of Arts, graduating as an artist, first class, in 1882. During his time there, he received several medals for his architectural designs. From 1883 to 1887, on behalf of the Academy, he was engaged in preserving ancient monuments throughout the Russian North, in major cities as well as rural areas.

He performed major studies linking the wooden architecture of that area with similar structures in Sweden and Norway. For comparative studies of stone architecture, he traveled to Germany, France and Italy. In 1886, for a project involving baths in the Pompeiian style, he was named an Academician of Architecture by the Russian Geographical Society. His extensive collection of drawings, figures and statistical materials was presented to the Academy in the early 1900s. Many of the archaeological objects that he collected were placed with the Russian Museum of His Imperial Majesty Alexander III. 

He also published compilations entitled Essays on the History of Old Russian Architecture, Materials on the architecture of Novgorod and Pskov, Old Ladoga (in collaboration with ) and Monuments of Old Russian Architecture.

From 1893 to 1900, he could be found at the Cathedral of St. Sophia, Novgorod, where he discovered hidden paintings and mosaics as well as the original throne. 

After the Revolution, he served as head of the architectural section of the Monument Protection Department of the People's Commissariat of the RFSFR. He died, most likely of natural causes, during the Russian Civil War, after having fled Moscow.

References

Further reading 
 Moscow architects of the time of eclecticism, modernism and neoclassicism (Зодчие Москвы времени эклектики, модерна и неоклассицизма), A. V. Shchuseva (Ed.) 1998, КРАБиК 
 А. М. Ginzburg and B. М. Kirikov, Architects-builders of St. Petersburg mid-XIX – early XX centuries (Архитекторы-строители Санкт-Петербурга середины XIX – начала XX века) 1996, Пилигрим 
 S. N. Kondakov, Anniversary Directory of the Imperial Academy of Arts (Юбилейный справочник Императорской Академии художеств). 1915

External links 

 V. V. Suslov Life and Creative Work @ Кенозерье
 A project by Suslov @ CityWalls

1857 births
1921 deaths
Russian architects
Russian architectural historians
Russian architecture writers
Architectural conservation
Architects from Moscow
Moscow School of Painting, Sculpture and Architecture alumni